Reginald Herbert Owen (25 May 1887 – 24 February 1961) was an Oxford don, public school headmaster and Anglican bishop.

Life and career

Born on 25 May 1887 he was educated at Dulwich College and Wadham College, Oxford.

 Alternating between secondary and tertiary education, he was an assistant master at Clifton College; a fellow and lecturer at Worcester College, Oxford; headmaster of Uppingham School; and fellow, chaplain and lecturer at Brasenose College, Oxford, before his ordination to the episcopate as Bishop of Wellington in 1947. In addition he was Primate of New Zealand from 1952 until his resignation on 29 February 1960.

Owen died on 24 February 1961.

Notes

External links
'Archbishop on Need for Unity', Sydney Morning Herald 29 April 1953

1887 births
People from Sydenham, London
People educated at Dulwich College
Fellows of Worcester College, Oxford
English educational theorists
Fellows of Brasenose College, Oxford
Headmasters of Uppingham School
Primates of New Zealand
Anglican bishops of Wellington
1961 deaths
Alumni of Wadham College, Oxford
20th-century Anglican archbishops in New Zealand
20th-century Anglican archbishops